WCUH-LD, virtual channel 16 (UHF digital channel 23), is a low-powered Visión Latina-owned-and-operated television station licensed to Fort Wayne, Indiana, United States.

Digital channels
The station's digital signal is multiplexed:

See also
List of radio stations in Indiana
List of television stations in Indiana

References

External links

Innovate Corp.
FWC-CD
Television stations in Indiana
Television channels and stations established in 2017
2017 establishments in Indiana